Oplan HACKLE was a supposed plot by rebel soldiers in the Philippines to overthrow the Arroyo administration, foiled by the Armed Forces of the Philippines (AFP) on February 24, 2006 (see Philippines under state of emergency, 2006).  Allegedly, the four-phase plot included a mass jailbreak of Magdalo mutineers and the unfolding of anti-government posters during a Philippine Military Academy reunion.

The rebel Magdalo soldiers are said to be working with the New People's Army, a communist military organization — The AFP claims "HACKLE" is an abbreviated form of "hammer and sickle".

External links
Armed Forces of the Philippines - Military Portal – Oplan HACKLE discovered
ABS-CBN Interactive – PMA reunion under tight guard
Military intelligence details coup plot in 'Oplan Hackle' - INQ7.net– Another source for Oplan Hackle 

Communist armed conflicts in the Philippines
Military history of the Philippines
Rebellions in the Philippines
Attempted coups in the Philippines
Presidency of Gloria Macapagal Arroyo